Archery at the 2010 Asian Games was held in Aoti Archery Range, Guangzhou, China.

Men and women competed in both individual and team events in recurve with all competition taking place from November 19 to 24, 2010.

Schedule

Medalists

Medal table

Participating nations
A total of 114 athletes from 21 nations competed in archery at the 2010 Asian Games:

References

 Official Report

External links
Archery Site of 2010 Asian Games

 
2010
Asian Games
2010 Asian Games events